The 1983 English cricket season was the 84th in which the County Championship had been an official competition. The third Prudential World Cup was won by India. New Zealand won a Test series in England for the first time. Essex won the Schweppes County Championship and Yorkshire won the Sunday League. The MCCA Knockout Trophy was inaugurated.

Honours
Schweppes County Championship - Essex
NatWest Trophy - Somerset
Sunday League - Yorkshire
Benson & Hedges Cup - Middlesex
Minor Counties Championship - Hertfordshire
MCCA Knockout Trophy - Cheshire
Second XI Championship - Leicestershire II 
Wisden - Mohinder Amarnath, Jeremy Coney, John Emburey, Mike Gatting, Chris Smith

World Cup

Test series

New Zealand played four Tests against England following the World Cup. Although they were heavily beaten in three of these, they won the second test at Headingley. This was New Zealand's first Test victory in England after 29 attempts. It was New Zealand's first away test win in over 13 years.

County Championship

NatWest Trophy

Benson & Hedges Cup

Sunday League

References

External links
 Schweppes County Championship 1983 at CricketArchive
 Benson and Hedges Cup 1983 at CricketArchive
 John Player Special League 1983 at CricketArchive
 Minor Counties Championship 1983 at CricketArchive

Annual reviews
 Playfair Cricket Annual 1984
 Wisden Cricketers' Almanack 1984

English cricket seasons in the 20th century
English Cricket Season, 1983
Cricket season